North Brother Island is a small island in Long Island Sound, part of the town of East Lyme, Connecticut. Its companion, South Brother Island is also a part of the town of East Lyme. Its coordinates are 41 degrees, 17 minutes 22 seconds North and 72 degrees, 14 minutes, 22 seconds West.

References

East Lyme, Connecticut
Coastal islands of Connecticut
Landforms of New London County, Connecticut